Sort-en-Chalosse (literally Sort in Chalosse) is a commune in the Landes department in Nouvelle-Aquitaine in southwestern France.

Population

See also
Communes of the Landes department

References

Communes of Landes (department)
Landes communes articles needing translation from French Wikipedia